In mathematical physics, the quantum KZ equations or quantum Knizhnik–Zamolodchikov equations or qKZ equations are the analogue for quantum affine algebras of the Knizhnik–Zamolodchikov equations for affine Kac–Moody algebras. They are a consistent system of difference equations satisfied by the N-point functions, the vacuum expectations of products of primary fields. In the limit as the deformation parameter q approaches 1, the N-point functions of the quantum affine algebra tend to those of the affine Kac–Moody algebra and the difference equations become partial differential equations. The quantum KZ equations have been used to study exactly solved models in quantum statistical mechanics.

See also
Quantum affine algebras
Yang–Baxter equation
Quantum group
Affine Hecke algebra
Kac–Moody algebra
Two-dimensional conformal field theory

References

Mathematical physics
Conformal field theory
Quantum groups
Equations of physics